The Gulidjan people (perhaps originally Kolidjon,), also known as the Kolakngat, or Colac tribe, are an Aboriginal Australian tribe whose traditional lands cover the Lake Colac region of the state of Victoria, Australia. They occupied the grasslands, woodlands, volcanic plains and lakes region east of Lake Corangamite, west of the Barwon River and north of the Otway Ranges. Their territory bordered the Wathaurong to the north, Djargurd Wurrung to the west, Girai Wurrung to the south-west, and Gadubanud to the south-east.

Language

The Gulidjan language was first identified in 1839, although much of the detail and vocabulary has been lost, there is sufficient to confirm that it constituted a separate language. About 100 words of the Gulidjan language have survived. Some analysis suggests it may be a mixed language or creole language having something in common with each of the neighboring languages. The word Colac/Kokak derives from the Gulidjan word kulak (sand) and the suffix -gnat. The ethnonym was analysed by James Dawson, who transcribed it as Kolakgnat, to mean 'belonging to sand'.

Roughly 200 words and the translated text of the Lord's Prayer survive from the Gulidjan language.

Country
The Gulidjan resided throughout some  near Lake Colac and Lake Corangamite, reaching down into harsh terrain towards Cape Otway. The inland boundary of their domain lay south of Cressy.

History
The Gulidjan people were hit hard by the European colonisation of their land shortly after the Foundation of Melbourne. For 3 years the Gulidjan actively resisted invasion by driving off livestock and raiding stations. Such raids brought retaliation by parties of colonisers with violent clashes ensuing. According to Jan Critchett's study an estimated 300-350 Aboriginal people were murdered in the 14 years from 1834 to 1848 during the colonial invasion of the Western District. The deaths of Joseph Gellibrand and George Hesse in 1837 - their fate remains a mystery to this day - were blamed on the Gulidjan with retribution delivered by a colonising party accompanied by some Wathaurong people, and killed several Gulidjan people. Ian Clark reports on three documented attacks in 1839-1840 resulting in Aboriginal deaths. More often squatters destroyed campsites and took implements as revenge, and by 1839 the Gulidjan were unable to live traditionally on their lands and began to take jobs on European stations.

The Reverend Francis Tuckfield from the Weslayan Mission Society established a mission station at Birregurra called Buntingdale in Gulidjan territory in 1839. Housing was only provided if tribal families would renounce polygamy. Early conflicts between the Gulidjan and Wathaurong peoples at the mission persuaded the missionaries to concentrate on one language group - the Gulidjan - in 1842.  Within three years the mission saw one tribe have its numbers halved, and the impact on the Colac tribe was said to be more drastic. The Gulidjan successfully resisted his attempts at cultural genocide through the indoctrination of Christian values and a sedentary lifestyle, and the mission was closed in 1848. At this point, they took refuge at Alexander Dennis Tardwarncourt station.

Coloniser Hugh Murray who first claimed the area in September 1837 claimed in 1853 that the local Gulidjan tribe was small, numbering between 35 and 40. By 1850, 43 males and 35 females were counted to be alive. With the influx of people searching for gold in the Victorian gold rush during the early 1850s, and the continuation of genocidal policies, by 1858 only 19 Gulidjan were left. Causes of this decline were identified in 1862 as starvation due to European occupation of the best grassed areas of their lands; European diseases such as chicken pox, measles and influenza; association with convicts; and tribal enmity. However, it is widely acknowledged that Australian historical accounts minimise the impact of genocidal practices on Aboriginal populations, and instead emphasise causes of population decline that have only indirect associations with the behaviour of colonisers, such as disease, or that blame Aboriginal communities for their own decline, such as due to violence.

In the 1860s a small reserve, Karngun, was established on the Barwon River at Winchelsea for the Gulidjan people. It was maintained until 1875. A house was built for them on the present Colac hospital site, but they preferred living in their traditional mia-mias. In 1872 16 hectares of land were reserved at Elliminyt, south of Colac for the Gulidjan with a brick house erected on the site. The Gulidjan preferred to use the house as a windbreak. Richard Sharp and Jim Crow, both Gulidjan people, established working leases on the site, and their families continued to hold their respective lots until 1948 when the land was sold by the Victorian Lands Department. Descendants of these families continue to live in the local area.

Society
The Gulidjan are a matrilineal society who intermarried with the Djab Wurrung, Djargurd Wurrung and Wada wurrung. Each person belonged to a moiety of gabadj (Black Cockatoo) or grugidj (White Cockatoo).

At interregional corroborees, where upwards of 20 tribes each having its own language or dialect, would gather, Gulidjan was one of four languages spoken, the other three being Tjapwurrung, Kuurn Kopan Noot and Wiitya whuurong, a dialect of Wathawurrung.

Clans
Before European settlement, 4 separate clans existed

Alternative names
 Kolidjon
 Kolac-gnat??.
 Kulidyan
 Lolijon
 Colijon, Koligon (g = dj): Coligan
 Loli(f)on (f is a misprint)
 Colac-conedeet (horde name)
 Karakoi, Karakoo
 Bungilearney Colagiens
 Kolakngat

Some words
  (child)
  (man)
  (moon)
  (breast)
  (father)

Notes

Citations

Sources

Aboriginal peoples of Victoria (Australia)
Colac, Victoria